IETF is the Internet Engineering Task Force, an organization developing Internet standards.

IETF may also refer to:

 International Engineering & Technology Fair, organized by the Confederation of Indian Industry
 International Essential Tremor Foundation, an organization supporting people with Essential tremors.
 Industrial Energy Transformation Fund, a funding program of the UK Department for Business, Energy and Industrial Strategy

See also